Shane Alexander (born ) is an Australian male volleyball player who plays the position of setter. He was part of the Australia men's national volleyball team at the 2010 FIVB Volleyball Men's World Championship in Italy. He played for Queensland Pirates.

Clubs
 Queensland Pirates (2010)

References

1986 births
Living people
Australian men's volleyball players
Place of birth missing (living people)